The 1918 Fordham Maroon football team was an American football team that represented Fordham University as an independent during the 1918 college football season. Fordham claims a 16–2–1 record. College Football Data Warehouse (CFDW) lists the team's record at 4–2–1. Opponents recognized by CFDW are displayed in bold in the schedule chart below.

Edward Siskind, a former Fordham player, was appointed as the head coach.

Left halfback Frankie Frisch, known as "The Fordham Flash", led the team on offense. He later played for 19 years in Major League Baseball from 1919 to 1937 and was inducted into the Baseball Hall of Fame.

Schedule

References

Fordham
Fordham Rams football seasons
Fordham Maroon football